Bidak (also Romanized as Bīdak) is a village in Jangal Rural District, in the Central District of Fasa County, Fars Province, Iran. At the 2006 census, its population was 92, in 22 families.

References 

Populated places in Fasa County